Senior hockey refers to amateur or semi-professional ice hockey competition. There are no age restrictions for Senior players, who typically consist of those whose Junior eligibility has expired. 
 
Senior hockey leagues operate under the jurisdiction of Hockey Canada or USA Hockey. They are not affiliated in any way with professional hockey leagues. Many former professional players play Senior hockey after their pro careers are over. The top Senior AAA teams in Canada compete annually for the Allan Cup.

History 
From the beginning of the 1900s until the 1970s, Senior hockey was immensely popular across Canada, particularly in rural towns. At a time when most households didn't have a television and few hockey games were broadcast, local arenas were filled to capacity to watch the local team take on a rival.

The popularity of Senior hockey declined in the 1980s and 1990s. A number of long-running leagues and teams vanished. Today, many players choose to play organized recreational hockey, sometimes referred to as "commercial hockey." The popularity of the National Hockey League and Junior hockey has also supplanted Senior hockey in many towns across Canada.

Senior AAA hockey leagues 
 Allan Cup Hockey (Ontario Sr. AAA)
 Allan Cup Hockey West (Alberta Sr. AAA)

Other leagues
Canada
 North Peace Hockey League
 Highway Hockey League
 Big 6 Hockey League
 Qu'Appelle Valley Hockey League
 Carillon Senior Hockey League
 South Eastern Manitoba Hockey League
 Western Ontario Athletic Association Senior Hockey League
 Avalon East Senior Hockey League
 Central West Senior Hockey League
 Eastern Ontario Super Hockey League
United States
 Great Lakes Hockey League
 Mountain West Hockey League
 Black Diamond Hockey League

References

External links 
 Allan Cup
 Hockey Canada - Allan Cup
 USA Hockey - adult hockey